is a former Japanese football player.

Playing career
Seino was born in Agano on 29 September 1981. After graduating from high school, he joined J1 League club Júbilo Iwata in 2000. On 29 April 2001, he debuted as substitute forward from the 87th minute against Nagoya Grampus Eight. However he could hardly play in the match until 2002 and was released from the club in June 2002. In November, he joined Regional Leagues club Shizuoka FC. In 2004, he moved to J2 League club Consadole Sapporo. In 2004, he played as forward all 44 matches and scored 9 goals. In 2005, although his opportunity to play decreased, he scored 10 goals. However he could hardly play in the match in 2006. In October 2006, he moved to Regional Leagues club Shizuoka FC again and played until end of 2008 season. In 2009, he moved to Hong Kong and joined Convoy Sun Hei in Hong Kong First Division League.

Club statistics

Honours
 Hong Kong League Cup: 2008–09

References

External links

1981 births
Living people
Association football people from Niigata Prefecture
Japanese footballers
J1 League players
J2 League players
Hong Kong First Division League players
Júbilo Iwata players
Hokkaido Consadole Sapporo players
Sun Hei SC players
Japanese expatriate footballers
Japanese expatriate sportspeople in Hong Kong
Expatriate footballers in Hong Kong
Association football forwards